Charles William Harkness (December 17, 1860 – May 1, 1916) was a son of Stephen V. Harkness (an original investor in the company that became Standard Oil) and his second wife, the former Anna M. Richardson.

Early life
Charles was born in Monroeville, Ohio on December 17, 1860. His parents were Stephen V. Harkness (1818–1888) and the former Anna Marie Richardson (1837–1926), his father's second wife.  He was the brother of Edward Harkness, noted philanthropist and half brother of Lamon V. Harkness.  He was a cousin of William L. Harkness.

His early education was in Cleveland at The Brooks Military Academy.   He earned a B.A. from Yale College with the Class of 1883.  While at Yale, he was described as "care-free, happy, irresponsible as the rest of us."

Career
On his father's death in 1888, Charles inherited stock in Standard Oil amounting to the second largest holding in the company, surpassed only by that of the Rockefeller family. Harkness became a director at Standard Oil and was a director of the Southern Pacific Railway Company, the Chicago, Milwaukee and St. Paul Railway, the Baltimore and Ohio Railroad, and the Tilden Iron Mining Company, and managed his father's immense holdings.

Harkness purchased the Henry Flagler townhouse at 685 Fifth Ave, New York and also owned a home in Madison, NJ and a winter home in St. Augustine, FL.

Personal life
On May 27, 1896, Harkness married Miss Mary Warden in Philadelphia, PA. Mary was the daughter of William G. Warden, who was an early Standard Oil partner, and the granddaughter of industrialist Daniel Bushnell.

Harkness fell seriously ill in fall 1915. After spending part of winter in St.Augustine at his wife's family home at Warden Castle, he returned home to New York, where he died May 1, 1916.  Since he had no children, the large portion of his Standard Oil stock was left to his brother Edward S. Harkness. One half his residual estate, his home in New York at 2 West 54th Street and his country home in Madison, NJ (designed by James Gamble Rogers who designed many Harkness buildings) were bequeathed to his wife Mary. He left $100,000 as a token of affection and esteem to his brother Lamon V. Harkness although Lamon had already died a year before Charles' death. Lamon had been quite wealthy in his own right from his inheritance from their father Stephen V. Harkness.

Legacy
Harkness Tower at Yale is named after Charles W. Harkness. Anna Harkness, his mother, donated $3,000,000 to build the Memorial Quadrangle of dormitories in his memory. Harkness Tower contains the Yale Memorial Carillon, a carillon of 54 bells, the largest of which is inscribed "In Memory of Charles W. Harkness, Class of 1883, Yale College."

The Cleveland Museum of Art has a $100,000 permanent endowment known as the Charles W. Harkness Endowment Fund, which was created through a donation from his widow, Mary Warden Harkness.

References

External links
 

1860 births
1916 deaths
Yale College alumni
American energy industry businesspeople
Charles
Burials at Woodlawn Cemetery (Bronx, New York)
People from Monroeville, Ohio